The Latvia national under-21 speedway team is the national under-21 motorcycle speedway team of Latvia and is controlled by the Latvian Motorcyclists Federation. The team was withdrew from 2006 Under-21 World Cup and was never started in Under-21 World Cup.

Competition

See also 
 Latvia national speedway team
 Latvia national under-19 speedway team

External links 
 (lv) Latvian Motorcyclists Federation webside

National speedway teams
Speedway
Team